Neurotomia is a genus of snout moths described by Pierre Chrétien in 1911.

Species
Neurotomia belutschistanella (Amsel, 1961)
Neurotomia coenulentella (Zeller, 1846)

References

Phycitinae